The list of ship commissionings in 1947 includes a chronological list of all ships commissioned in 1947.


See also 

1947
 Ship commissionings